The men's synchronised 3 metre springboard is part of the Diving at the 2022 Commonwealth Games program. The competition will be held on 5 August 2022 at Sandwell Aquatics Centre in Birmingham, England.

Jack Laugher returns as two-time defending champion, but with a new partner, Anthony Harding, following the retirement of fellow double-Commonwealth and Olympic gold medalist Chris Mears, and the move to a new partnership of his 2020 Olympic partner Daniel Goodfellow, who joins Jordan Houlden. As in previous Games, nations can send more than one team to a synchronised event. Malaysia also field two teams.

Schedule
All times are BST (UTC+1)

Format
A single round will be held, with each team making six dives. Eleven judges score each dive: three for each diver, and five for synchronisation. Only the middle score counts for each diver, with the middle three counting for synchronisation. These five scores ware averaged, multiplied by 3, and multiplied by the dive's degree of difficulty to give a total dive score. The scores for each of the six dives are then aggregated to give a final score.

Results
The initial field for the event was published on 22 July 2022:

References

Diving at the 2022 Commonwealth Games